Leaf painting is the process of painting with dyed leaves.  Deriving from Japan, China or India, it became popular in Vietnam.  Its two main forms are: Cutting and pasting dry leaf to make leaf paintings or using paint to draw onto the surface of dry leaf to make leaf paintings.

Every product is unique, quite different from the others because of the leaves' veins, the forms, and the colors before or after dying.

External links 
 About the Vietnamese Leaf Painting
 Báo ảnh Việt Nam - Tranh lá Vũ Gia 
 Ngoisao.net - Lá rụng thành tranh 
 Công an nhân dân & An ninh thế giới - Lạ lùng tranh lá 
 Việt báo - Người thổi hồn vào tranh lá thốt nốt 
 VnExpress - Biến lá rụng thành tranh 

Painting techniques
Leaves